The Holton Bath House is a bathhouse in Holton in Jackson County, Kansas which was built in 1938 as a WPA project.  It was listed on the National Register of Historic Places in 2009.

The listing includes two contributing buildings: the bath house and a filter house.  It includes the pool as a non-contributing structure because the original Depression-era pool was replaced in 1986. Bob Paulette and Murray Wilson were design engineers for the project.

It is built of steel and reinforced concrete on a concrete foundation.

References

Buildings and structures on the National Register of Historic Places in Kansas
Buildings and structures completed in 1938
Jackson County, Kansas
Public baths on the National Register of Historic Places
Works Progress Administration in Kansas